Darren Meredith is an Australian former professional rugby league footballer who played in the 1980s. He played for the Canterbury-Bankstown Bulldogs in 1985, the Canberra Raiders in 1986 - 1987 and the Newcastle Knights in 1988.

Playing career
Meredith made his first grade debut for Canterbury-Bankstown in Round 26 1985 against Western Suburbs.  Meredith did not feature in the club's 1985 premiership victory over St George.

In 1986, Meredith joined Canberra spending 2 seasons with them before signing with newly admitted club Newcastle in 1988.

Meredith played 2 games for Newcastle with his last being a 14–4 defeat against Western Suburbs in Round 17 1988.

References

External links
http://www.rugbyleagueproject.org/players/Darren_Meredith/summary.html

Living people
Australian rugby league players
Canberra Raiders players
Newcastle Knights players
Place of birth missing (living people)
Canterbury-Bankstown Bulldogs players
1962 births
Rugby league wingers
Rugby league centres